Valentina Nikolayevna Artamonova (born 13 December 1960, Nesterovo, Sokolsky District, Vologda Oblast) is a Russian political figure, deputy of the 8th State Duma convocation. In 1984 she graduated from the Leningrad Institute of Finance and Economics (now – Saint Petersburg State University of Economics). For more than 40 years, she has been specializing in financial management. Throughout her career, Artamanova occupied various positions in the administration of the Vologda Oblast. In 2012-2013 she was the Deputy Governor of the Vologda Oblast. Since 19 September 2021 she has served as a deputy of the State Duma of 8th convocation. She ran with the United Russia to represent the Vologda Oblast constituency.

In 2018 she was awarded an Order "For Merit to the Fatherland".

References

1960 births
Living people
People from Sokolsky District, Vologda Oblast
United Russia politicians
21st-century Russian politicians
Eighth convocation members of the State Duma (Russian Federation)
Northwestern Management Institute alumni